

Aces

</onlyinclude>

Notes

References 

Victories, 15